Greenfield is a city in southwestern Weakley County, Tennessee, United States. The population was 2,182 at the 2010 census and 2,078 in 2018.

Geography
Greenfield is located at  (36.156875, -88.801290).

Demographics

2020 census

As of the 2020 United States census, there were 2,031 people, 1,017 households, and 600 families residing in the city.

2000 census
As of the census of 2000, there were 2,208 people, 925 households, and 624 families residing in the city. The population density was 611.6 people per square mile (236.2/km2). There were 1,007 housing units at an average density of 278.9 per square mile (107.7/km2). The racial makeup of the city was 90.49% White, 8.56% African American, 0.36% Native American, 0.05% Asian, 0.05% from other races, and 0.50% from two or more races. Hispanic or Latino of any race were 0.50% of the population.

There were 925 households, out of which 30.6% had children under the age of 18 living with them, 49.9% were married couples living together, 14.5% had a female householder with no husband present, and 32.5% were non-families. 30.1% of all households were made up of individuals, and 16.3% had someone living alone who was 65 years of age or older. The average household size was 2.39 and the average family size was 2.95.

In the city, the population was spread out, with 24.7% under the age of 18, 8.8% from 18 to 24, 28.1% from 25 to 44, 21.7% from 45 to 64, and 16.6% who were 65 years of age or older. The median age was 37 years. For every 100 females, there were 85.5 males. For every 100 females age 18 and over, there were 81.0 males.

The median income for a household in the city was $26,380, and the median income for a family was $35,417. Males had a median income of $27,153 versus $19,507 for females. The per capita income for the city was $14,215. About 12.7% of families and 14.7% of the population were below the poverty line, including 21.3% of those under age 18 and 13.7% of those age 65 or over.

Notable people
Tandy Darby - Member of the Tennessee House of Representatives, representing Tennessee's 76th House District

Media
 WWGY 99.3 "Today's Best Music with "Ace & TJ in the Morning"
 WRQR-FM 105.5 "Today's Best Music with "Ace & TJ in the Morning"
 WTPR-AM 710 "The Greatest Hits of All Time"

See also

 List of cities in Tennessee

References

External links

Cities in Tennessee
Cities in Weakley County, Tennessee